Rickey Bryan Cotton (July 1, 1957 - November 29, 2007) was a researcher in electromagnetism and radar-related fields at the Georgia Tech Research Institute's Sensors and Electromagnetic Applications Laboratory from 1980 until 2007.

Education
Cotton received a bachelor's degree in electrical engineering at Auburn University in 1980 and also received a Master of Science in electrical engineering from the Georgia Institute of Technology in 1983.

Career
Cotton joined the Georgia Tech Research Institute (GTRI) as a research engineer in 1980 and quickly became instrumental in the expansion of the Sensors and Electromagnetic Applications Laboratory (SEAL) by forging a strong relationship with the Office of Naval Intelligence. A protégé of Richard C. Johnson, Cotton helped oversee GTRI's installation of the compact radar range at Fort Huachuca in 1989. He was named a division chief at SEAL in 2000.

Legacy
GTRI named the Rickey B. Cotton Electromagnetic Phenomenology Laboratory at the Cobb County Research Facility in his honor in 2011.

References

2007 deaths
Georgia Tech Research Institute people
Georgia Tech alumni
Auburn University alumni
1957 births